JCAG may refer to:
Journal of the Canadian Association of Gastroenterology, a medical journal
Justice Commandos of the Armenian Genocide, a militant organization